Wright Thornburgh King (January 11, 1923 – November 25, 2018) was an American stage, film and television actor whose career lasted for over forty years. He is best known for playing Jason Nichols in the television series Wanted Dead or Alive (1958–1961).

Early life and career
King studied acting at the St Louis School of Theater, from which he graduated in 1941, before enlisting in the United States Navy during World War II, in which he served in the South Pacific campaign from 1943 to 1945.
 
King made his small screen debut in 1949 as Midshipman Bascomb in the television series Captain Video and His Video Rangers.

Throughout his career, he worked in both the United States and in the United Kingdom.

King was cast in numerous westerns and is particularly known for his role in the 1951 film adaptation of Tennessee Williams' A Streetcar Named Desire, starring Vivien Leigh (whom his character kisses). Prior to that, he had appeared in the original stage production, a performance which was lauded by drama critic Harold Hobson. In 1958 King appeared as the Kiowa Kid/Nevada Jones on the TV western Cheyenne in the episode "Ghost of the Cimarron." In 1957 King starred as Joe Digger, a falsely accused horse thief who was hung but saved, then hung again after he killed one of his original hangers in the Gunsmoke episode "Born to Hang". King also appeared in eleven episodes of the television series Wanted Dead or Alive starring Steve McQueen, often playing a young sidekick named Jason Nichols.

Other noteworthy film credits included roles in Cast a Long Shadow (1959), King Rat (1965), Planet of the Apes (1968), Finian's Rainbow (1968) and Invasion of the Bee Girls (1973).

In 1974, he played U.S. Senator Richard B. Russell Jr. of Georgia in the TV movie The Missiles of October, a dramatization of the Cuban Missile Crisis of 1962.

He appeared in the television series Johnny Jupiter, was in two episodes of the TV series The Silent Service (S01 E10 "The Pampanito" and S01 E20 "The Squailfish") and was the partner of Steve McQueen for several episodes during a season of Wanted Dead or Alive. He appeared with Richard Boone in Have Gun – Will Travel in the episodes "Helen of Abajinan" and "A Knight to Remember". He also appeared with James Arness in Gunsmoke in the 1961 episode "Colorado Sheriff" (S6E38), the 1964 episode “No Hands” (S9E19) and the 1965 episode "The Bounty Hunter" (S11E7).

Personal life
King married June Ellen Roth in 1948. The couple had their first child the next year.

He died in Canoga Park, Los Angeles on November 25, 2018, at the age of 95.

Filmography

Selected television

References

External links

 
 
 
  

1923 births
2018 deaths
United States Navy personnel of World War II
Male actors from Oklahoma
American male film actors
American male stage actors
American male television actors
Male actors from Los Angeles
Male actors from Portland, Oregon
20th-century American male actors
Western (genre) television actors
Male Western (genre) film actors